Lectionary 29, designated by siglum ℓ 29 (in the Gregory-Aland numbering), is a Greek manuscript of the New Testament on parchment. Palaeographically it has been assigned to the 12th-century.

Description 

The codex contains lessons from the Gospels of John, Matthew, and Luke (Evangelistarium), with lacunae. It is written in Greek minuscule letters, on 156 parchment leaves, 2 columns per page, 23 lines per page. It contains musical notes.
The manuscript is "elegantly written but much worn".

History 

The codex was merely examined by Griesbach. C. R. Gregory saw it in 1883.

The manuscript is not cited in the critical editions of the Greek New Testament (UBS3).

Currently the codex is located in the Bodleian Library (Auct. D. inf. 2. 15) in Oxford.

See also 

 List of New Testament lectionaries
 Biblical manuscript
 Textual criticism

Notes and references

Bibliography 
 

Greek New Testament lectionaries
12th-century biblical manuscripts
Bodleian Library collection